Buckupiella is a genus of South American anyphaenid sac spiders containing the single species, Buckupiella imperatriz. It was  first described by Antônio Brescovit in 1997, and has only been found in Brazil and Argentina. This genus is named after the Brazilian arachnologist Erica Helena Buckup.

References

Anyphaenidae
Monotypic Araneomorphae genera
Spiders of Argentina
Spiders of Brazil
Taxa named by Antônio Brescovit